P. K. Basheer is the member of 14th Kerala Legislative Assembly. He is a member of Indian Union Muslim League and represents Eranad constituency.

Positions held
President, Edavanna Service Co-operative Bank (13 Years)
Muslim Youth League, Edavanna Panchayat (1985)
Muslim League, Wandoor Constituency (1990)
Vice-President, District Committee Muslim Youth League (1991) 
Member, Muslim Youth League State Working Committee (1996)
Director (1991–98); Malappuram District Service Co-operative Bank (1991–98) 
Member, District Panchayat (Since 2001), State Working Committee, Muslim League (since 2004)

Personal life
He was born at Edavanna on 25 September 1959. His parents are P. Seethi Haji and Fathima. He is married to Raziya Basheer and has three children.

See also
 Bahauddeen Muhammed Jamaluddeen Nadwi

References

Members of the Kerala Legislative Assembly
Indian Union Muslim League politicians
1959 births
Living people